"Definition" is the first single from Black Star's eponymously titled 1998 album (see 1998 in music). It is produced by Hi-Tek, who samples "The P Is Free" by Boogie Down Productions for the track's beat. In addition, the song's chorus interpolates "Stop the Violence" by Boogie Down Productions. The chorus and the song's lyrics in general deal with the necessity to stop violence in hip hop. An underground hit the song still reached #60 on the Billboard Hot 100 chart. It is featured on multiples compilations such as Best of Decade I: 1995-2005, Rawkus Records' greatest hits album. Allmusic writer Jason Kaufman considers it to be a "flawless" track.

A reprise of "Definition" titled "RE: DEFinition" can be found on the Black Star album.

It also appears on MTV Classic's 90's Nation and Yo! Hip Hop Mix.

Track list

A-side
 "Definition" (Radio Version)
 "Definition" (What We Really Said)
 "Definition" (Instrumental to Your Development)

B-side
 "Twice Inna Lifetime" (Radiohead Version)
 "Twice Inna Lifetime" (Streethead Version)
 "Twice Inna Lifetime" (Instrumentally Yours)

Charts

References

See also
List of Talib Kweli songs

1998 singles
Protest songs
Black Star (group) songs
Songs written by Mos Def
Songs written by Talib Kweli
Songs written by Hi-Tek
1998 songs
Rawkus Records singles